Adawro is an exclosure located in the Dogu'a Tembien woreda of the Tigray Region in Ethiopia. The area has been protected by the local community since 1994.

Environmental characteristics
 Average slope gradient: 70%
 Aspect: the exclosure is oriented towards the northeast
 Minimum altitude: 2635 metres
 Maximum altitude: 2705 metres
 Lithology: Basalt

Management
As a general rule, cattle ranging and wood harvesting are not allowed. The grasses are harvested once yearly and taken to the homesteads of the village to feed livestock. Physical soil and water conservation has been implemented to enhance infiltration, and vegetation growth.

Benefits for the community
Setting aside such areas fits with the long-term vision of the communities were hiza’iti lands are set aside for use by the future generations. It has also direct benefits for the community:
 improved infiltration 
 improved ground water availability
 honey production
 climate ameliorator (temperature, moisture)
 carbon sequestration, dominantly sequestered in the soil, and additionally in the woody vegetation)

Water conservation

In the Adawro exclosure, more than 800 precise measurements were done in 2003 and 2004, using five runoff plots, where the volume of runoff was measured daily. The rock type (basalt), slope gradient and slope aspect were the same, the only difference was the land management and vegetation density. Whereas in degraded rangeland, 11.4% of the rainfall flows directly away to the river (runoff coefficient), this happens only for 2.5% of the rain in a recent exclosure and 3.2% in a eucalyptus forest.
In 2003, the soils of the then young exclosure could hold 280 litres of water per m³, similar to the adjacent rangeland.

Improved ecosystem
With vegetation growth, biodiversity in this exclosure has strongly improved: there is more varied vegetation and wildlife.

Trees
The main tree species found in the exclosure are:
 Flat top acacia (Acacia abyssinica, renamed as Vachellia abyssinica)
 Golden wattle (Acacia saligna)
 Rumex nervosus, a woody sorrel species
 Aloe macrocarpa

Soils
Main soil type in the exclosure are Phaeozems,  formed  in sediment that has been trapped by the vegetation of the exclosure, and as a remnant of the original situation before deforestation. Remarkably, also in the well-protected eucalypt plantation there is some undergrowth and soil development.

References

External links
 Link For Forestry Projects

Exclosures of Tigray Region
1999 establishments in Ethiopia
Land management
Environmental conservation
Environmentalism in Ethiopia
Emissions reduction
Dogu'a Tembien